Trois-Fontaines-l'Abbaye is a commune in the northeastern French department of Marne.

See also
Communes of the Marne department

References

Troisfontaineslabbaye